Curtil-Vergy is a commune in the Côte-d'Or department in eastern France. It has an average population density of 51 people per km2, and an unemployment rate between 9.4 and 10.6%. It is known for its hiking.

Population

See also
Communes of the Côte-d'Or department

References

Communes of Côte-d'Or
Côte-d'Or communes articles needing translation from French Wikipedia